GPCR neuropeptide receptors are G-protein coupled receptors which bind various neuropeptides.  Members include:

 Neuropeptide B/W receptor
 NPBWR1
 NPBWR2
 Neuropeptide FF receptor
 NPFFR1
 NPFFR2
 Neuropeptide S receptor
 NPSR1
 Neuropeptide Y receptor
 Y1 - NPY1R
 Y2 - NPY2R
 Y4 - PPYR1
 Y5 - NPY5R

References

External links

 

G protein-coupled receptors